The City of Frankston was a local government area about  south of Melbourne, the state capital of Victoria, Australia.

History

The City of Frankston had its origins in the Mount Eliza Road District, which was created on 6 November 1860, and redesignated as a shire and renamed Mornington on 24 November 1871. 

The West riding of Mornington Shire was excised to create the New Mornington Shire on 30 May 1893 (and was itself renamed Mornington Shire on 15 January 1894), and the remaining East and North ridings were renamed Frankston & Hastings Shire on 20 October 1893. The two shires were almost reunited in a major local government reform programme in 1915.

On 19 October 1960, the Central and Eastern Ridings of Frankston & Hastings Shire were severed, and with parts of the Eastern Riding of the Shire of Flinders, were incorporated as the Shire of Hastings. The remainder was renamed the Shire of Frankston.

After a petition was received by the Government on 4 May 1966, Frankston Shire was proclaimed as a city on 24 August 1966.

On 15 December 1994, the City of Frankston was abolished, and along with parts of the Cities of Cranbourne and Springvale, was merged into the new City of Frankston. Parts of Mount Eliza were transferred to the newly created Shire of Mornington Peninsula.

Some changes occurred between the release of the Local Government Board report in July 1994 and the actual amalgamation; the original plan was to merge Frankston with the City of Chelsea, and take Braeside and Carrum Downs from the City of Springvale. However, Frankston City Council submitted that it should expand eastwards instead, as well as taking Mount Eliza and Baxter. By October, the present boundaries had been agreed upon, but the new entity was to be known as the City of Nepean. This appeared in the Board's final report in November 1994. However, the State Government ultimately decided to use the old name for the new entity, departing from the Board's recommendation.

Council formerly met at the Civic Centre at Young Street and Davey Street, Frankston. The facility is still used for the same purpose by the new City of Frankston.

Wards

The City of Frankston was divided into four wards, each of which elected three councillors:
 North Ward
 East Ward
 Centre Ward
 South Ward

Suburbs
 Baxter (shared with the City of Cranbourne and the Shire of Hastings)
 Carrum Downs (shared with the City of Cranbourne)
 Frankston*
 Frankston North
 Frankston South
 Mount Eliza (shared with the Shire of Mornington)
 Seaford

* Council seat.

Population

* Estimate in the 1958 Victorian Year Book.

References

External links
 Victorian Places - Frankston City

Frankston
Frankston, Victoria
1860 establishments in Australia
1994 disestablishments in Australia
City of Frankston